, also known as , was an empress consort of  Emperor Go-Nijō.

She was the eldest daughter of Daijō-daijin Tokudaiji Kintaka.

In 1303, Kinshi became a court lady of Emperor Go-Nijō. She gained the position of chūgū later the same year. However, she did not bear the emperor any children. In 1308, Go-Nijō died, and Kinshi became a nun. In 1311, she was granted the name Chōrakumon-in. 

She died in 1352, at the age of 70.

Notes

Fujiwara clan
Japanese empresses
Japanese Buddhist nuns
14th-century Buddhist nuns
1283 births
1352 deaths
People from Kyoto